Hydrogen ozonide is a radical molecule consisting of a hydrogen atom covalently bonded to an ozonide unit.

It is possibly produced in the reaction of the hydroxyl radical with dioxygen: OH• + O2 → HO3•.

It has been detected in a mass spectrometer experiment using HO3+ (protonated ozone) as precursor.

References

Extra reading

Hydrogen compounds
Ozonides